The Airport Rail Link (ARL) is an express and commuter rail line in Bangkok, Thailand. The line provides an airport rail link from Suvarnabhumi Airport, via Makkasan station, to Phaya Thai station in central Bangkok. Most of the line is on a viaduct over the main eastern railway. It is owned by State Railway of Thailand (SRT) and, since 2021, operated by Asia Era One Company Limited. The -long Airport Rail Link opened for service on 23 August 2010.

History
The airport link contract was signed in January 2005, and construction began in July 2005. The line was built by a consortium of B.Grimm, STECON, and Siemens. The cost of the project was 25.9 billion baht.

The line is built largely along the same alignment as the failed Bangkok Elevated Road and Train System (BERTS) project, which was started by Hopewell Holdings and ceased construction in 1997, when only 10 percent of the project had been completed. Many idle pillars left from BERTS stood in the way of the new system. After an extensive debate and an engineering review on their suitability for use in the ARL project—and demands for compensation from Hopewell—the SRT eventually decided to demolish the pillars and build new ones.

Originally scheduled to be completed by 2007, the Hopewell debacle, an extended bidding process, and a series of legal challenges from squatters and property owners who had encroached on SRT's land, repeatedly delayed the project. Initial test runs were conducted in October 2009, with a free limited trial service open to the public running from April 2010. Full commercial services were launched on 23 August 2010. It was initially operated by the S.R.T. Electrified Train Company (SRTET), a wholly owned subsidiary of the State Railway of Thailand (SRT).

In October 2021 operation of the line was transferred to a new special-purpose vehicle led by the consortium of Charoen Pokphand (CP) Holding and partners including Ch. Karnchang PLC. (CK), Bangkok Expressway and Metro PLC. (BEM), Italian-Thai Development PLC. (ITD) and China Railway Construction Corporation (CRCC)  and the service rebranded as AERA1 City. The consortium will also operate the Don Mueang–Suvarnabhumi–U-Tapao high-speed railway.

Operations
Services originally consisted of both express services and the City Line, a commuter rail service with eight stations. However since September 2014, all express services have been suspended indefinitely due to a shortage of rolling stock availability.

The ARL operates daily from 05:30 to 24:00, with services departing every 10–11 minutes during peak hours (06:00-09:00 and 16:00-20:00) and every 12–13 minutes off peak and weekends.

The number of passengers using the service in the first three years of operation was about half that projected. The SRT estimated about 95,000 passengers total per day, but the actual ridership was about 40,000, including 38,000 for the City Line and 2,500 for the Express Line. Airport Rail Link, a subsidiary of the SRT set up to operate the Airport Link services, has operated at a loss since the start of its operations. The ARL averaged around 56,000 passengers a day on weekdays and 40,000 a day on weekends in 2015. As of May 2018, the daily average is around 72,000 passengers and overcrowding it still a major problem during peak periods due to insufficient rolling stock with only 7 of the 9 trains operational.

City Line 
The commuter/suburban City Line stops at all eight stations. It is used by many residents and students in the eastern suburbs as well as airport staff. The City Line has suffered from significant overcrowding since 2012. City Line units allow passengers to bring bicycles during off peak periods and on weekends, but excessively large bags for trips to the airport can be difficult during peak periods.  The system has come under some local scrutiny for this.

Express Line 
On 1 June 2011, additional Express Line services became available between Phaya Thai station and the airport with a journey time of 18 minutes. This resulted in two distinct Express Services: one to/from Phaya Thai with a 60-minute headway; and one to/from Makkasan Terminal also with a 60-minute headway. This was due to a design flaw in the original laying of the rail which meant that the Express Line track terminates at Makkasan and does not connect with the City Line track which run on the outer side of the Express line, to Phaya Thai. The SRT allocated 17m baht in Feb 2012 to rectify this problem. As of early 2018 the two tracks had still not been connected.

At the end of April 2014, the Phaya Thai Express service was suspended for 12 months due to insufficient rolling stock being available while long term, overhaul maintenance of the express rolling stock was undertaken. Thereafter, the hourly Makkasan Express service was only averaging 400 passengers a day. Subsequently, in September 2014 the SRTET decided to suspend the Makkasan Express due to low passenger numbers and insufficient rolling stock. There have been no Express Services since this time. It will eventually be replaced with high speed train services once the Don Mueang–Suvarnabhumi–U-Tapao high-speed railway is complete.

Fares 
Standard fare for the City Line is between 15–45 baht depending on distance. (The Express Line was priced between 90/150 baht for one way/return).

City Air Terminal check-in 
From 4 January 2011, a baggage check-in service began for passengers traveling on flights operated by Thai Airways, 08:00–21:00. Passengers checking in at Makkasan station (the city air terminal) were required to purchase an Express Line ticket and check in at least between 3 and 12 hours in prior to flight departure. Bangkok Airways discontinued baggage check-in service in this facility on 13 June 2011. However, very few passengers—20 or fewer per day—used the Makkasan station check-in service. The SRTET stated that they wanted to encourage further airlines to use the City check in service in early 2014 with a target of 1,000 people a day by late 2014. However, in July 2014 the SRTET stated that it would most likely cease check-in operations as only 10 people were using it a day with only 200 pieces of luggage checked in each month. The service was costing SRTET 5.27m baht a month. All check-in services ceased in September 2014 when the Express service was suspended.

Specifications
Commuter trips take 27 minutes from Phaya Thai to Suvarnabhumi Airport. Unlike most railways in Thailand, which use meter-gauge railways, the Airport Rail Link uses standard-gauge railways.

All stations were built to accommodate 10-car trains, and the express train platform of Makkasan station and all platforms at Suvarnabhumi are fitted with platform automatic screen doors.

At Makkasan and Suvarnabhumi, both lines have their own tracks and platforms. At Hua Mak the express line can bypass the city line via a passing loop.

Rolling stock
Nine four-car and three-car Siemens Desiro EMUs based on the British Rail Class 360 are used. The only significant difference from the UK units is a much larger air conditioning pod on the roof, providing extra cooling to cope with the Thai climate. As with other Class 360 units, the trains were built in Krefeld, Germany - and were delivered from 2007, and testing in Bangkok began in March 2008. On 15 May 2012 the Thai Cabinet approved a budget of 5.2 billion baht for the SRT to order seven new, four car sets of Siemens Desiro rolling stock to be delivered by 2014. However, as of June 2013 no orders for new rolling stock had been placed.

Four Express trains—four cars, red colour—were used for the two separate express service between Makkasan and Phaya Thai and Suvarnabhumi 
Airport. The fourth car is a baggage car with no passenger seating The other five City Line trains—three cars, blue colour—are used for commuter City Line service stopping at all eight stations on the Airport Line.
Since the suspension of the Express Services in September 2014, all Express sets have been used as all stop City Line services. In 2017, the SRTET commenced refurbishment of the four Express trains to install seating in the fourth car in order to increase passenger capacity.

New rolling stock order 
Approval was granted by the Transport Ministry (MOT) for the SRT to purchase seven new, four car sets of rolling stock in early 2012 due to overcrowding and the urgent need to provide extra rolling stock. During 2013, the MOT reviewed the purchase intention to consider cheaper Chinese rolling stock. In December 2013, the Thai Cabinet approved 4.9 billion baht for the seven new sets of rolling stock. As of mid-2014, a supplier had not been selected, but the SRT indicated its intention to invite bidders to tender for new rolling stock in September 2014. 
This was subsequently delayed with the SRT expecting to conduct an e-tender in April 2015 with a schedule to sign the contract by June 2015. However, a subsequent tender was suspended in 2016 after allegations of corruption surrounding the bidding process.

In early 2017, the SRT Deputy Director stated that the new rolling stock would be tendered and a contract signed by the end of 2017. However, in January 2018 the SRT stated that the purchase would be delayed until the finalisation of the Eastern high speed line tender as rolling stock for this line would be used on the extended ARL.

Stations

Extension to Don Mueang Airport

Since its inception, the ARL was intended to be extended north to the new SRT Krung Thep Aphiwat Central Terminal and ultimately Don Mueang Airport (DMK). This would use the SRT Dark Red Line and main SRT north line corridor. The  extension— underground and  elevated—would consist of five stations beyond the current terminus at Phaya Thai: Ratchawithi (underground), Krung Thep Aphiwat Central Terminal, Bang Khen, Laksi, and Don Mueang.

Originally, it was thought that work on the extension would not commence until after 2016. However, the Thai Cabinet designated a two-airport policy in March 2012 encouraging airlines, particularly low-cost carriers, to move to Don Mueang Airport. This resulted in an advance of the ARL extension timeline. The SRT budgeted for the extension in its 2013 budget and the 27 billion baht extension was planned to be tendered in the latter half of 2013. The political crisis in the last three months of 2013 and early-2014 delayed any further progress of the project. The military coup of May 2014 resulted in a military administration which did not fund the project in 2014. The ARL was intended to be the backbone of a future high speed rail line (HSR) to Chonburi and Rayong - originally scheduled to be completed by 2018. The military coup of May 2014 subsequently resulted in deferring all HSR line proposals for a period of two years. Construction resumed along the elevated line to the station at Don Mueang International Airport in late 2016.

In February 2015, the Thai Cabinet approved a budget for land appropriation with the expectation that the extension would be tendered later in 2015. However, this did not occur and there was no advance on the project in 2016. In 2017 that the Thai Government decided that the new Eastern high speed line would originate at Don Mueang Airport, and not Krung Thep Aphiwat Central Terminal. Thus, this project effectively became the ARL extension to Don Mueang Airport as it will use the ARL track and stations.

In early 2018, the SRT stated that the Eastern HSR line section from Phaya Thai to Krung Thep Aphiwat and Don Mueang Airport is expected to be tendered by May 2018 with a 4 months auction period before the successful bidder is awarded. The cost of the project is estimated to be over 200 billion baht, of which the Thai Government will fund 123 billion baht and the private sector estimated to contribute 90 billion baht.

As of April 2020, the Don Mueang–Suvarnabhumi–U-Tapao rail connection was still described as is a "proposed railway". It has been envisaged to partly run as a high-speed line. In October 2021, state authorities announced that the link connecting all three airports will be ready in four years. In July 2022, the government announced construction would begin in October 2022, and be competed in 2026.

Airport extension 
Passive provision is being made for an extension of the rail link to a future second terminal at Suvarnabhumi Airport. The Suvarnabhumi second terminal station will be on ground floor before the Suvarnabhumi station that is on underground floor.

Gallery

See also
 Mass Rapid Transit Master Plan in Bangkok Metropolitan Region
 SRT Dark Red Line
 SRT Light Red Line
 BTS Skytrain
 Sukhumvit line
 Silom line
 MRT (Bangkok)
 MRT Blue Line
 MRT Brown Line
 MRT Grey Line
 MRT Light Blue Line
 MRT Orange Line
 MRT Pink Line
 MRT Purple Line
 MRT Yellow Line
 Bangkok BRT

Notes

References

External links

 Airport Rail Link – official website 
 Airport Rail Link, BTS, MRT & BRT network map
 "2Bangkok Airport Rail thread" Semi-regular updates, articles, pictures and commentary (In English)
 Guide to the Airport Link For Tourists. Including current timetables and ticket prices. 

2010 establishments in Thailand
 
Bangkok
Railway lines opened in 2010
Standard gauge railways in Thailand
25 kV AC railway electrification